Chutia,  Sutia and Sutiya are variants of a surname from Assam, India. It is mainly used by the Chutia people.

Notable persons with the surname include:
 Joyanti Chutia (born 1948), Indian physicist
 Sonaram Chutia (1915–2013), Indian independence activist, scholar and educationist.

See also

Indian surnames